Oscar Viñas (born 1877, date of death unknown) was an Argentine Olympic fencer. He competed in the individual foil event at the 1928 Summer Olympics.

References

1877 births
Year of death missing
Argentine male fencers
Argentine foil fencers
Olympic fencers of Argentina
Fencers at the 1928 Summer Olympics